Invasion is a Magic: The Gathering block that consists of the expert-level expansion sets Invasion (September 2000), Planeshift (February 2001) and Apocalypse (June 2001). The Invasion block centered on multicolored cards.

Storyline

Invasion
The time has come. Urza the Planeswalker must now help Gerrard Capashen and the crew of Weatherlight to repel the invading Phyrexians from Dominaria. However, it will not be easy, as Yawgmoth will stop at nothing to get what he wants.

Apocalypse
Following Gerrard and the Weatherlight's victory at Koilos and the death of Hanna, Yawgmoth unleashes the Apocalypse on Dominaria by coming to the world himself, and raising the dead from the earth. As this was after a war that lasted a few years, there were many, many dead.

Set history
Invasion saw the return of multi-colored "gold" cards, absent since the Stronghold expansion. Its major themes revolved around multicolor decks and strategies. The popularity and appeal of "gold" cards along with high but balanced power level culminated into making Invasion one of the most popular Magic sets in the game's history.  The set was designed by Bill Rose, Mike Elliot and Mark Rosewater. The multi-color nature of the set had been decided by late in 1998, with the design relying heavily on an early draft set design by original playtester Barry Reich.  Invasion was the first set to be released digitally on Magic Online.

Planeshift continued Invasion's theme of multi-colored "gold" cards. Its major themes revolved around multicolor decks and strategies.

Mechanics
The sets in the Invasion block focus on multicolored cards.  Invasion and Planeshift focus on allied-colored cards, while Apocalypse focus on enemy-colored cards.

Invasion introduced several new mechanics. One of these was kicker, an optional cost in addition to the card's casting cost. Paying this additional cost would activate an additional ability or effect on the card. Invasion had a number of cards that have an effect based on the number of basic land types the casting player controlled, which was given the name "Domain" in Conflux.  Invasion was also the first set with split cards: literally two cards printed on one, Split cards had two different effects for different costs. As they were played, their controller chose which half to use.  They were almost killed in development as almost all of Wizard's R&D disliked them.

Planeshift introduced the gating mechanic. Creatures with gating cost less to play, but their controller must return a creature he or she controls to its owner's hand.  It also had a cycle of "familiar" creatures that reduced the cost of allied-colored spells.

Apocalypse reprised many cycles found in Invasion, including enemy-colored "Bears" and "split cards." Apocalypse's single most important cycle of cards were the enemy-colored "painlands," which promoted the set's theme, power level, and popularity.

Notable cards
Notable cards in Apocalypse include Fire // Ice,  and

References

External links
Wizard's official page for Invasion
Set contents
Wizard's official page for Planeshift
Wizards of the Coast's official page for Apocalypse

Magic: The Gathering blocks
Card games introduced in 2000